Sophie Moressée-Pichot (born 3 April 1962) is a French fencer. She won a gold medal in the women's team épée event at the 1996 Summer Olympics.

References

External links
 

1962 births
Living people
French female épée fencers
Olympic fencers of France
Fencers at the 1996 Summer Olympics
Fencers at the 2000 Summer Olympics
Olympic gold medalists for France
Olympic medalists in fencing
Sportspeople from Aisne
Medalists at the 1996 Summer Olympics
20th-century French women